The following table lists the various web template engines used in Web template systems and a brief rundown of their features.

See also
 Template processor
 Web template system
 JavaScript templating
 :Category:Template engines
 Java template engine performance report in spring boot

Notes

References 

Scripting languages

Computing comparisons